KNSS may refer to:

 KNSS (AM), a radio station (1330 AM) licensed to Wichita, Kansas, United States
 KNSS-FM, a radio station (98.7 FM) licensed to Clearwater, Kansas, United States
 KFH (AM), a radio station (1240 AM) licensed to Wichita, Kansas, United States, which held the KNSS call sign from 1987 until 2004
 KBUL-FM, a radio station (98.1 FM) licensed to Carson City, Nevada, United States, which held the KNSS call sign from 1984 until 1987
 Confederation of New Trade Unions of Slovenia "Independence", known in Slovene as Konfederacija novih sindikatov Slovenije - Neodvisnost